The Shamshadin District was a raion (district) of the Armenian Soviet Socialist Republic from 1929 and later in 1991 of the Republic of Armenia until its disestablishment in 1995. The Shamshadin district today constitutes a southeastern part of the Tavush Province (marz). Its administrative centre was the town of Berd.

History 
The Shamshadin district was formed on the territory of the Armenian SSR on 24 June 1929, originally a part of the Dilijan uezd which had been separated from the tsarist Kazakh uezd in 1921.

Shortly after the breakup of the Soviet Union, the administration of the Republic of Armenia consolidated the Shamshadin, Noyemberyan and Ijevan districts into the larger Tavush Province.

Demographics 
According to the 1939 census, Shamshadin was the most homogenous region of the Armenian SSR.

Villages 

There were 16 villages in the Shamshadin District:

 Berd
 Aygedzor
 Aygepar
 Artsvaberd
 Varagavan
 Verin Karmiraghbyur
 Movses
 Navur
 Nerkin Karmiraghbyur
 Norashen
 Paravakar
 Tavush
 Chinari
 Chinchin
 Choratan
 Verin Tsaghkavan

Notable people 

 Hayk Chobanyan
 Sarkis Ordyan
 Vardan Stepanyan
 Sassun Mkrtchyan

Notes

References 

Tavush Province
Districts of Armenia
Geography of Tavush Province